Tekno may refer to:
Tekno (musician), Nigerian singer-songwriter sometimes referred to as Jkay
Tekno (toy manufacturer), toy maker from Copenhagen, Denmark
Tekno Autosports, Australian motor racing team
Tekno the Robotic Puppy, robotic toy
Free tekno, music genre
Freetekno, a cultural movement associated with the music genre